Robert J. Rubel (born Robert Jack Rubel II, October 5, 1944) also known as "Dr. Bob", is an American author and educational speaker. He specializes in the area of alternative sexuality, focusing on the fields of BDSM (Bondage, Discipline, Sado-masochism) and TPE relationships (Total Power Exchange) He is the author of many books on the subject (see below). 

Since 2007, Rubel has presented, including making keynote speeches, at alternative sexuality conferences and weekend workshops in US, Canada and Australia. More recently, he co-hosts a weekly Zoom room that discusses issues related to M/s theory and practice.

Since 2014, Rubel, has been the lead author for eight books on communication, BDSM, or Total Power Exchange. Before 2014, Rubel’s books were published by the Nazca Plains publishing house.

Education
After completing his undergraduate degree at Colorado State University in 1966 he taught English for three years in the Los Angeles Public School System. From teaching, he returned to learning, and enrolled in Boston University where, in 1970 he received a Master's degree. Rubel then received a Ford Foundation grant to the University of Wisconsin where he researched disorders, disruptions, and crimes in public schools from 1950  1975. In 1977, Rubel received a doctorate degree in Education with a minor in Criminology. In 1976, Rubel received a visiting fellowship from the National Institute of Justice to document the literature and history of school-based crime and violence.

Career
In 1977, Robert Rubel and Peter Blauvelt founded the National Alliance for Safe Schools (NASS): The NASS  looked for ways to prevent crimes committed by students in public schools. The NASS conducted school security audits in urban school districts. Until 1992, NASS was a research and technical assistance affiliate of the National Association of School Safety and Law Enforcement Officials (NASSLEO).

From 1986 to 1988, Rubel was an administrator for the American Association of Woodturners.

In 2001, Rubel began study in the field of alternative sexuality. He wrote a series of twelve books on BDSM, sexuality, and "authority transfer" dynamics. In 2007, Rubel joined the North American and international lecture circuit, speaking on his chosen topic. From 2007 to 2008, Rubel edited the "Power Exchange Books Resource Series" and its associated "Power Exchange Magazine". In 2009, his book, Squirms, Screams, and Squirts: Handbook for going from great sex to extraordinary sex was picked by Playboy Online as their number one gift book recommendation for Valentine's Day. in 2009, Penthouse Forum mentioned the same book for their 2009 Valentine's issue.

Awards
Rubel was the recipient of the 2008 Pantheon of Leather's Community Choice Award (man).

Rubel was a judge for leather contests and is considered an expert on allexperts.com.

See also
Guy Baldwin
Hardy Haberman
Jack McGeorge
Jay Wiseman
Lee Harrington
Midori (author)

Bibliography

Non fiction publications

 Rubel, R. and Indigo, The Goddess. (2020) Safe, Sexy and Consensual: Creating Magic in the Dungeon Red Eight Ball Press, Austin. 

 Rubel, R. and     Petterson, Veronica.(2020) In One Ear and Out the Other: Essential     guide for effective communication Red Eight Ball Press, Austin. 
 Rubel, R. and     Fairfield M. (2016) Master/slave Mastery – Protocols: Focusing the     intent of your relationship Red Eight Ball Press, Austin 
 Rubel, R. and     Fairfield, M. (2015) Master/slave Mastery – Advanced: Refining the     fire: ideas that matter Red Eight Ball Press, Austin 
 Rubel, R. et     al (2014) BDSM Mastery – Basics: your guide to play, parties, and scene     protocols Red Eight Ball Press, Austin 
 Rubel, R. and     Fairfield, M. (2014) BDSM Mastery – Relationships: a guide for creating     mindful relationships for dominants and submissives Red Eight Ball     Press, Austin 
 Rubel, R. and     Fairfield, M. (2014) Master/slave Mastery: Updated handbook of     concepts, approaches, and practices Red Eight Ball Press, Austin  
 Rubel, R.     (2010) Squirms, Screams, and Squirts: The Workbook Nazca Plains,     Las Vegas 
 Rubel, R.     (2009) Screams of Pleasure: Guide for Extraordinary Sex for those with     Erectile Dysfunction Nazca Plains, Las Vegas 
 Rubel, R.     (2007) Protocols: Handbook for the female slave Nazca Plains, Las     Vegas, second edition. 
 Rubel, R.     (2007) Master/slave Relations: Communications 401 – The Advanced     Course. Nazca Plains, Las Vegas. ASIN: B00IFVA542.
 Rubel, R.     (2007) Master/slave Relations: Solutions 402 – Living in Harmony     Nazca Plains, Las Vegas ASIN: B01K2JNT3S.
 Rubel, R.     (2007) Squirms, Screams, and Squirts: Handbook for going from great sex     to extraordinary sex Nazca Plains, Las Vegas 
 Rubel, R. and Walker, David (2006) Flames of Passion:     Handbook of Erotic Fire Play Nazca Plains, Las Vegas 
 Rubel, R.     (2006) Master/slave Relations: Handbook of Theory and Practice     Nazca Plains, Las Vegas 
 Rubel, R.     (2006) Parts: The Erotic Photographic Art of Robert J. Rubel, PhD     Nazca Pains, Las Vegas 
 Rubel, R.     (2006) Wholes: The Erotic Photographic Art of Robert J. Rubel, PhD     Nazca Pains, Las Vegas 
 Rubel, R.     (2006) Holes: The Erotic Photographic Art of Robert J. Rubel, PhD     Nazca Plains, Las Vegas

Power Exchange Books’ Resource Series
The first four books in this series consist of nine or ten articles of about 3,500 words each by invited authors. The final book by Lee Harrington is longer.

 Rubel, R. and Stassinopoulas, A. (2007) Playing with Disabilities Las Vegas: Nazca Plains 
 Rubel, R. and Morgan, L. (2008) Protocols, a Variety of Views Las Vegas: Nazca Plains, 
 Rubel, R. and Laura, S. (2008) The Art of Slavery Las Vegas: Nazca Plains, 
 Rubel, R. and Colin (2008) Age Play Las Vegas: Nazca Plains 
 Rubel, R. and Harrington, L. (2009) Ropes, Bondage, and Power Las Vegas: Nazca Plains

Power Exchange Magazine
From 2007 to 2008, Rubel was the managing editor of Power Exchange Magazine. The publisher, Herbert Moseley, used the author pseudonym "Robert Steele". Nine volumes were published. The volumes included: Master/slave Relations, male Master (2006) ; Master/slave Relations, female Master (2007); Bootblacking (2007); FemDomme (2007) ; Pony Play (2007); Polyamory (2007); Daddy/boy (2007); Leather Spirituality (2007); and Pup/Trainer (2007).

Publications relating to crime in public schools 
 Rubel, R. (1990) "Cooperative school system and police responses to high risk and disruptive youth" in Student Discipline Strategies: Research and Practice. Albany, New York: SUNY Press
 Rubel, R. (1987), "Safer schools, better students: toward a systematic approach to addressing serious misbehavior in public schools" in Violence, Aggression and Terrorism 1: p. 81  96.
 Rubel, R. (Compiler) (1985) Compendium of Survey Instruments for Evaluating Student, Teacher, and School Victimization by Crime Austin, Texas: National Alliance for Safe Schools.
 Rubel, R. (Ed.) (1985) Guide for Creating School Safety Plans. Examples of Key Directives and Plans Austin, Texas: National Alliance for Safe Schools.
 Rubel, R. (1985) "Enter the security audit" in American School and University p 47  48 and 54.
 Rubel, R. (1984) Analyzing School Incidents: A Process Guide Austin, Texas: National Alliance for Safe Schools.
 Rubel, R. (Ed.) (1983) Handbook for Developing Program-Level Impact Evaluations of School Security Programs Austin, Texas: National Alliance for Safe Schools
 Halatyn, T. and Rubel, R. (1982) "Attacking the cause of crime in schools: effect or fallacy?" in Campus Strife vol 2 (summer) p. 2  4
 Wayne, I. and Rubel, R.  (1982) "Student fear of crime in schools" in Urban Review (fall)
 Rubel, R. (1982) "School crime prevention: NOLPE's Role" in School Law Update Topeka, Kansas: National Organization on Legal Problems of Education
 Rubel, R. (1981), "If I were dictator: how I would reduce crime and violence in schools" Update on Law Related Education (spring) p. 26  31
 Wayne, I. Rubel, R. (1981), "Violence is creating apprehensive students" Campus Strife Vol. 3 (summer) p. 26  31
 Rubel, R. (1981) "Discipline or prosecute: a matter of definitions" Campus Strife Vol. 4 (winter) p. 10  11
 Rubel, R. (1980) "Vandalism: new perspectives provide new insights" in Bulletin of the National Association of Secondary School Principals 64:435 (April) p. 67  75
 Rubel, R. (1980) "Extent, perspectives, and consequences of violence in schools" in Violence and Crime in the Schools Lexington, MA: D.C. Heath and Company.
 Rubel, R. et al (1980), "Reflections on the rights of students and the rise of school violence” in Violence and Crime in the Schools Lexington, MA: D.C. Heath and Company.
 Burgan, L. and Rubel, R. (1980) "Public school security, yesterday, today, and tomorrow" in Contemporary Education 52:1 (fall) p. 13  17
 Baker, K. and Rubel, R. Violence and Crime in the Schools Lexington, MA: D.C. Heath and Company, 
 Rubel, R. (1979) "Victimization and fear in public schools: survey of activities" in Victimology V 3:3 and 4 p. 339  341. 
 Rubel, R. (1979) "The relationship between student victories in the courts and student violence in the schools" in Contemporary Education 50:4 (summer) p. 226  230
 Rubel, Robert J. (1978), "Assumptions Underlying Programs Used to Prevent or Reduce Student Violence in Secondary Schools." Theoretical Perspectives on Poverty and School Crime. Springfield, VA: National Technical Information Service: 1239-1265.
 Rubel, R.  (1978), "Understanding school-based violence: a litany of issues" School-Law Update Topeka, Kansas: National Organization on Legal Problems of Education 1977 p. 353  366
 Rubel, R. (1978) "Violence in public schools: HEW's safe school study" Bulletin of the National Association of Secondary School Principals 62:416 (March) p. 75  84
 Rubel, R. (1978) "Analysis and critique of HEW's safe school study" Journal of Crime and Delinquency (July) p. 257  265
 Rubel, R. (1978) "What HEW's safe school study means for teachers: findings and implications" American Educator (May) p. 13  16
 Rubel, R. (1977) "The unruly school: disorders, disruptions, and crimes" Lexington, Mass.: D.C. Heath and Co. 
 Rubel, R. (1977) "Student violence and crime in secondary schools from 1950 to 1975: an historical view" Criminal Justice Abstracts 9:4 (December) p. 527  542

Reports prepared for Federal agencies
 Rubel, R. and Ames N. (1986) "Reducing school crime and student misbehavior: a problem solving strategy"  Washington, D.C. U.S. Department of Justice, National Institute of Justice
 Rubel, R. (1983) "Crime analysis for schools and school districts: a process guide" Washington, D.C. U.S. Department of Justice, National Institute of Justice
 Rubel, R. (1982) "Policy brief: reducing crime in schools, developing a program of accountability and management of disruptive youth. Washington, D.C.  U.S. Department of Justice, National Institute of Justice
 Halatyn, T. and Rubel, R. (1981) "Juvenile crime causes in the public schools: an assessment of the existing research." Sacramento, CA  California Commission on Crime Control and Violence Prevention.
 Rubel, R. (Senior compiler) (1979) "School crime and disruption: a selected bibliography" Washington, D.C. U.S. Government Printing Office, National Criminal Justice Reference Service, Law 	Enforcement Assistance Administration.
 Rubel, R. (1979) "Summary volume: theoretical perspectives on school crime and poverty" Springfield, VA: National Technical Information Service

Media Credits
 Rubel, R. (2012) Fire Play: A Safety Training Course (70-minute DVD plus 64-page book), Las Vegas: Nazca Plains.
 Rubel, R. (2012) Impact Play 101: Building Your Skills (70-minute DVD plus 48-page book), Las Vegas: Nazca Plains.

Contributions
Raven Kaldera (2014), Paradigms of Power: Styles of Master/Slave Relationships. MA: Alfred Press,

References

Presenting on BDSM Topics
http://leatherinthepines.com/presenters.html
http://leatherreign.org/About/Leather%20Reign%202012/index.html
http://www.greatlakesleather.org/index.php/presenters/108-dr-bob-rubel
http://leatherreign.org/Presenters/Presenters/DrBobandJen.html
https://mobile.twitter.com/BaraknSheba/status/560194389927292928
http://www.sin-in-the-city.com/yesteryears-past-events/sin-in-the-city-2013/presenters/dr-bob-rubel
http://www.rmrebellion.com/presenters-2016
http://themsgathering.com/?page_id=219
https://nelaonline.org/uploads/fff/fff38ProgramBook.pdf
http://masterslaveconference.org/fetish-marketplace/msc-bookstore/
http://sinsationsinleather.com/presenters/bobrubel.html
http://leatherreign.org/About/Leather%20Reign%202012/index.html
http://greatlakesleather.org/index.php/presenters/108-dr-bob-rubel
http://www.leatherati.com/2010/03/gear-up-for-the-weekend-of-march-12-2010/
http://tayiswaayperfect.blogspot.com/2012/12/colonial-kink-review-from-november-2012.html
http://sinsationsinleather.com/presenters/bobrubel.html

Media
Interview with Erotic Awakening http://eroticawakening.libsyn.com/ea095-squirms-screams-and-squirts-with-robert-rubel 
Neuro Linguistic Programming Endorsement http://www.nlptrainingquest.com/testimonial/
Creative Sexuality Webinars https://www.youtube.com/channel/UCCtc--GAV-B_T_6epPfeNPQ

1946 births
Living people
American erotic artists
American male non-fiction writers
American relationships and sexuality writers
American sex educators
BDSM writers
Education reform